Sorrow of the Angels is an album by the American doom metal band While Heaven Wept.

Track listing
"Thus With a Kiss I Die" - 16:58
"Into the Wells of Sorrow" - 9:44
"The Death of Love" - 9:57
"September" - 2:21

Credits
 Tom Phillips – guitars, vocals, and keyboards
 Danny Ingerson – bass, keyboards
 Jon Paquin – drums

References

Sorrow of the Angels by While Heaven Wept @ Encyclopaedia Metallum
Reviews of While Heaven Wept @ whileheavenwept.com

1998 albums
While Heaven Wept albums